Keith Derrick McKenzie (born  October 17, 1973) is a former American football linebacker and defensive end who played for four teams in an 8-year National Football League (NFL) career.

Keith is the nephew of Buffalo Bills legend Reggie McKenzie.

References

External links
NFL.com player page

1973 births
Living people
Players of American football from Detroit
American football linebackers
American football defensive ends
Ball State Cardinals football players
Green Bay Packers players
Miami Dolphins players
Cleveland Browns players
Chicago Bears players
Buffalo Bills players
Wayne State Warriors football coaches
Ball State Cardinals football coaches
Coaches of American football from Michigan